Antônio Flávio Aires dos Santos (born 5 January 1987) is a Brazilian footballer who plays as a striker for Ponte Preta. Antônio Flávio is more commonly known as Flávio by the fans and commentators.

Career
Flávio started his career at Atlético Goianiense (from 2003–2005), then he went on to Andraus (2006). In 2007, he was signed to Santo André and he was put on their professional squad a year later.

Flávio was in 2009 spotted by AIK Fotboll representatives and was later signed to the Swedish club. Flávio quickly formed a good partnership with Argentinian striker Iván Obolo. Flávio's first goal for the Solna club came against Gothenburg team Häcken. He added another two goals to his tally when he struck two goals against Stockholm rivals Djurgårdens IF. His celebration became controversial after he tore off his shirt, revealing an identical match shirt under it. He also caused some controversy post-game when a T-shirt adorned with "Hata Göteborg" (Hate Gothenburg) was given to him. Flávio later said that he didn't know what the phrase meant; he thought it had something to do with the fight for first place.
On 1 November 2009, Flávio won Allsvenskan with AIK after scoring the equaliser against IFK Göteborg. AIK went on to win the game 2-1 away at Ullevi.

On 3 January Flávio transferred to Shanghai Shenxin of the Chinese Super League.

Honours 

AIK
 Allsvenskan: 2009
 Svenska Cupen: 2009
 Supercupen: 2010

References

Player profile - AIK fotball

1987 births
Living people
Brazilian footballers
Esporte Clube Santo André players
Associação Desportiva São Caetano players
AIK Fotboll players
Shanghai Shenxin F.C. players
Associação Atlética Ponte Preta players
Campeonato Brasileiro Série A players
Campeonato Brasileiro Série B players
Allsvenskan players
Chinese Super League players
Brazilian expatriate footballers
Expatriate footballers in Sweden
Expatriate footballers in China
Brazilian expatriate sportspeople in China
Association football forwards